Jewell is a hamlet in Oneida County, New York, United States. It is a community in the Town of Vienna, on the northeastern corner of Oneida Lake, near the border of Oswego County. It lies on State Route 49, approximately 30 minutes from the City of Syracuse to its west and 30 minutes to the City of Utica on the east.

History
The first settler is said to have been Eliphalet Jewell, who owned land there in 1814.  Silas Jewell may have come about the same time.  After coming to Jewell, Silas moved to Constantia for about 5 years and then came back to Jewell about 1822.  Jewell was known as "West Vienna" until 1921 when the name was changed to "Jewell," in honor of the Jewell family.

Jewell was once a major town on the east–west road which parallels the Oneida Lake shoreline.  In the past it was a thriving community with a store, hotel, mills, boat-building and lumber industries.  A small community Church stands in the center as a testament to a time of watermills, farms, maple sap houses, and an older way of living.  Home to the once famous Idel Wild Land (1820) and in the late 1900s a beautiful French piece-and-piece log mansion, built in the tradition of the French Fort, constructed  as a testament to this waterfront community's revival.

The New York, Ontario & Western railroad used to serve towns on the north side of Oneida Lake, including Jewell.  It was removed in 1957, to be turned into a recreational trail for horse and snowmobile riders.  The trail is called the Oswego Recreational Trail to the west, in Oswego County, but has no name in Jewell's Oneida County.

Jewell is home to several Indian legends including an Oneida Lake Creature and a great Indian Treasure.

Hamlets in New York (state)
Hamlets in Oneida County, New York